S. Ballesh Bhajantri (born Ballappa Sanna Bharamappa Bhajantri) is a popular Indian classical Hindustani shehnai player. He is a disciple of shehnai player Ustad Bismillah Khan, he is benares gharana shehnai player and a patiala gharana hindustani vocalist, ghazal singer, Indian playback singer and musician, Ballesh is credited with popularizing the shehnai, a reeded woodwind instrument. He is also a Prasar Bharati's All India Radio (AIR) and Doordarshan artist.

He is awarded India's fourth-highest civilian honour, the Padma Shri, in 2022, in the field of Art, He is the second classical musician of India after Ustad Bismillah Khan to receive the award as a shehnai player  He has also worked for Ilaiyaraaja and A. R. Rahman.

Early life and education
Ballesh was born to Shehnai player Sanna Bharamanna and Yellamma in M.K.Hubli, Kittur, Belgaum district, Karnataka. He started learning Shehnai from his father, and later continued from his (uncle) father's elder brother Dodda Bharamanna and with musicians such as D.P. Hiremath, and Pt. Puttaraj Gawai. he was also a Bismillah Khan's disciple, Bismillah Khan once remarked that Ballesh will be the "assurance for the future of Shehnai in Indian classical music".

Musical career

Shehnai

Ballesh plays various styles on the shehnai: aalaapi and aakaar like khayal singing, jhala like sitar and sarod, tatkar like kathak dancers, meend and harquatts like sarangi and violin, and continuity tones like bansuri. He has also performed jugalbandis, along with sitarist Ustad Shahid Parvez, mohan veena player Pandit Vishwa Mohan Bhatt and accompanied by tablist Yogesh Samsi, Subhankar Banerjee.

Film music
Ballesh has been a musician for many music directors in Hindi, Telugu, Malayalam, Tamil, Kannada, Bengali, Gujarati, Marathi, Rajasthani, Punjabi, Oriya, Sanskrit, English, Tulu, Konkani and Bhojpuri cinema, performing compositions by Naushad Ali, M. S. Viswanathan, Satyam (music director), G.K. Venkatesh, Ravindra Jain, Ravendra master, Ilaiyaraaja, A. R. Rahman and M. M. Keeravani. He has sung and played shehnai for more than 9,000 movies background scores and 45,000 film songs in several languages, more than 50,000 devotional songs for several religions and languages, he has sung Hindustani music Alaaps for films, and had also collaborated on shehnai with international musicians and composers in recordings. He has sung several songs along with the singers K. J. Yesudas, S. Janaki, S. P. Balasubrahmanyam, Ilaiyaraaja, M. M. Keeravani and A. R. Rahman. Ballesh appeared playing shehnai for the Hindi film Raanjhanaa, with music by A.R. Rahman. He also played shehnai for the song "The Dichotomy of Fame" in Imtiaz Ali's 2011 Hindi film Rockstar and also played for Yeh Jo Des Hai Tera song for Hindi film Swades, with music and sung by A.R. Rahman, and also in Bigil Tamil film with music by A.R. Rahman.

Music Education
Ballesh founded Tansen Academy of Music, a school of Hindustani Classical Music, with his musical work continued by his three sons by Prakash, Krishna and Shivanand Ballesh.

Awards and recognition

 2019 Karnataka Kalashri by Government of Karnataka
 2020  Kalaimamani (Joint Award)by Government of Tamil Nadu 
 2021 Ustad Bismillah Khan Kala Ratna Samman (Joint Award) by India Tourism Varanasi, Government of India and by Ustad Bismillah Khans family members.
 2022, Padma Shri, by Government of India

Other awards 
 Vishwa Kala Puraskar, 2022, by Vishwa Kala Sangama, chennai.
 Kittur Chennamma Memorial Award 2022, Karnataka State Government Award by Department of Kannada and Culture Belagavi 
 Belawadi Mallamma Memorial Award 2022, Karnataka State Government Award under Department of Kannada and Culture Belagavi 
 Zee Tamil TV Excellence in Music Award 2019,
 Bhimsen Samman International Award, Gadag 2017 joint award with Krishna Ballesh 
 Mirchi Music Awards, 2016, Jury Award for Outstanding contribution Telugu Industry 
 Sanaadi Appanna Kalashree Puraskar, 2016
 Excellence Vocational Award 2011 by Dr. M.G.R. University, during 150th birth anniversary of Rabindranath Tagore.
 Mirchi Music Awards, 2009, Jury Award for Outstanding contribution Kannada Industry 
 Honorary Doctorate from Bengaluru North University, Kolar 2022.

Performances 

 2016 Performed for 100th birthday anniversary of Ustad Bismillah Khan 
 2016 Performed for 64th anniversary of the “Sawai Gandharva Bhimsen Mahotsav”  
 2015 Performed at the 140th Baba Harballabh Sangeet Sammelan that commenced at Shri Devi Talab Mandir, Jalandhar.
 2006 Played a musical tribute to Krishna Hangal, daughter of Gangubai Hangal, at the presentation award ceremony for the first Krishna Hangal Memorial Award of the Hangal Music Foundation at the Sawai Gandharva Hall in Hubli.

References

External links

 

Living people
Indian male classical musicians
Shehnai players
Musicians from Karnataka
People from Belagavi district
Recipients of the Padma Shri in arts
Hindustani singers
Kannada people
1958 births
Film musicians from Karnataka
Artists from Karnataka
Singers from Karnataka
Kannada playback singers
Tamil playback singers
Telugu playback singers
Malayalam playback singers
Film music